is the fourth single by Japanese girl group NMB48. It has sold 375,785 copies. The title "Nagiichi" is shortened from

Members

"Nagiichi" 
Senbatsu* 
Centers: Sayaka Yamamoto, Watanabe Miyuki 
 Team N: Mayu Ogasawara, Kanako Kadowaki, Riho Kotani, Rina Kondo, Kei Jonishi, Miru Shiroma, Aina Fukumoto, Nana Yamada, Sayaka Yamamoto, Akari Yoshida, Miyuki Watanabe
 Team M: Momoka Kinoshita, Eriko Jo, Airi Tanigawa, Ayaka Murakami, Fuuko Yagura

"Rifujin Ball" 
Undergirls
 Team N: Rika Kishino, Haruna Kinoshita, Kanna Shinohara, Shiori Matsuda, Yuuki Yamaguchi
 Team M: Riona Ota, Rena Kawakami, Yuuka Kodokari, Yui Takano, Ayame Hikawa, Runa Fujita, Mao Mita, Sae Murase, Natsumi Yamagishi
 Kenkyūsei: Yuki Azuma, Yuumi Ishida, Mizuki Uno, Ayaka Okita, Narumi Koga, Arisa Koyanagi, Sorai Sato, Hiromi Nakagawa, Rurina Nishizawa, Momoka Hayashi, Mizuki Hara, Hitomi Yamamoto, Hono Akazawa, Akari Ishizuka, Anna Ijiri, Mirei Ueda, Mako Umehara, Yuuri Oota, Yuuka Katou, Emika Kamieda, Konomi Kusaka, Rina Kushiro, Hazuki Kurokawa, Saki Kono, Rikako Kobayashi, Nanami Sasaki, Kamo Sugimoto, Riko Takayama, Sora Togo, Riko Hisada, Arisa Miura, Kanako Muro, Syu Yabushita, Tsubasa Yamauchi

"Saigo no Catharsis" 
Shirogumi
 Team N: Riho Kotani, Haruna Kinoshita, Rina Kondo, Rika Kishino, Kei Jonishi, Kanna Shinohara, Aina Fukumoto, Sayaka Yamamoto
 Team M: Eriko Jo, Ayaka Murakami, Fuuko Yagura, Yuuka Kodakari

"Boku ga Mou Sukoshi Daitan Nara" 
Akagumi
 Team N: Mayu Ogasawara, Kanako Kadowaki, Miru Shiroma, Nana Yamada, Akari Yoshida, Yuuki Yamaguchi, Miyuki Watanabe
 Team M: Airi Tanigawa, Momoka Kinoshita, Keira Yogi, Ayame Hikawa, Rena Shimada

"Hatsukoi no Yukue to Play Ball" 
NMB Seven
 Team N: Mayu Ogasawara, Aina Fukumoto, Nana Yamada, Sayaka Yamamoto, Miyuki Watanabe
 Team M: Eriko Jo, Airi Tanigawa

"Warukii" 
 Team N: Miyuki Watanabe

Oricon Charts

References

2012 singles
Japanese-language songs
Songs with lyrics by Yasushi Akimoto
NMB48 songs
2012 songs